Baker Nagar Sundrasi or simply Sundrasi is a village near cb ganj in Bareilly district of Uttar Pradesh, India.

Villages in Bareilly district